François Maurin (died. 21 January 2018), was the Chief of Staff of the Armies in 1971 to until 1975.

François Maurin, a general of the French air was born 9 March 2018 and has recorded more than 8000 flight hours, he was enrolled in the Air School in 1938 having held many high position in the military service before taking over as CEMA in 1971.

Awards and decorations 

 Grand Cross of the Legion of Honor
 National Order du Mérite
 Croix de Guerre 39-45
 Croix de Guerre

References  

 

1918 births
2018 deaths
People from Paris
French generals
French military personnel of World War II
French soldiers